Wiliot is a startup company developing Internet of Things technology for supply-chains and asset management, founded in 2017 and based in Caesarea, Israel, with customer operations in San Diego, US.

Wiliot develops battery-free printable sensor tags to monitor products like groceries, apparel and pharmaceuticals from their sources to stores and homes. The company's business model is to sell the use of its cloud software.

History
Wiliot was founded in 2017 by Tal Tamir, Yaron Elboim, and Alon Yehezkely, following the sales of their previous startup Wilocity to Qualcomm in 2014.

In 2019, Williot closed a $30 million series B round of funding from Amazon, Avery Dennison, Samsung and its previous series A investors Norwest Venture Partners, 83North Venture Capital, Grove Ventures, Qualcomm Ventures, and M Ventures. Other early investors include PepsiCo, NTT Docomo Ventures, and Vintage Investment Partners.

In 2021 Wiliot raised $200 million in a series C funding round lead by SoftBank Vision Fund 2 and backed by all previous investors.

Technology
Wiliot’s tags, called IoT Pixels, are a postage stamp-sized printed computer that powers itself by harvesting the energy from surrounding Wi-Fi, cellular and Bluetooth radio signals. The IoT Pixel tags have sensors for temperature, fill level, motion, location changes, humidity, and proximity. The tags cost less than 10 cents a piece.

The IoT Pixel includes an ARM Cortex-M0+ processor core, Bluetooth Low Energy connectivity, 1 kB of non-volatile memory, and antennas for Bluetooth and energy harvesting. Dual-band models include connectivity in the ISM bands.

In June 2022, Wiliot launched a business card-sized battery-assisted version of the IoT Pixel providing continuous connectivity.

Data from the sensors is fed into a Wiliot Cloud server, where algorithms help its customers make decisions through a software as a service subscription.

As of 2022, Wiliot is the assignee of 66 patents that relate to harvesting energy from very weak sources, running a computer element on tiny amounts of energy, producing a computer element in a thin, flexible form factor and the cloud services that enable sensing from such a system.

Applications
Wiliot’s tags are designed for use in the many crates that agriculture shippers use to get their products to markets. The tags can provide information about the safety of the journey and the condition of perishable goods, to better manage inventory and reduce waste. Its first large public customer was Israeli supermarket chain Shufersal in June, 2022.

The  has experimented with reducing food loss throughout the food supply chain from producers to stores and in consumers’ homes by visualizing product information using Wiliot’s tags.

The company hopes to extend more broadly to sectors like pharmaceuticals and apparel Their tags can sense when a consumable is nearing end of life, or when a non-perishable consumable is almost used up, or how many washings a garment has been given.

Recognition
The industry recognition received by Wiliot include:

 Winner of the 2019 CableLabs Innovation Showcase
 Winner of the FDA’s Low- or No-Cost Food Traceability Challenge 2021
 Frost & Sullivan’s 2022 North American Battery-free Bluetooth Low Energy Tag Technology Innovation Leadership Award
 Frost & Sullivan’s 2022 European Passive BLE-based IoT Solutions Customer Value Leadership Award
 2022 SXSW Innovation Awards Finalist in the Smart Cities, Transportation & Delivery category

References

External links

 
 Wiliot: Mr. Beacon podcast

2017 establishments in Israel
Cloud applications
Companies of Israel
Internet of things companies
Israeli companies established in 2017
Supply chain software companies
Wireless sensor network